Several ships have been named Belfast:

, a paddle steamer built in 1829 for service between Glasgow and Belfast, then HMS Prospero from 1837
, a Dublin-Liverpool passenger cargo steamer of the City of Dublin Steam Packet Company, later sold to Latvia
, a coastal passenger ship of Eastern Steamship Lines, running between Boston, Massachusetts and Bangor, Maine
, a Town-class cruiser launched in 1938, now a museum ship in London
, the third planned of the type

References

 
 

Ship names